Paul Anthony Truswell (born 17 November 1955) is an English Labour Party politician and former Member of Parliament (MP) for Pudsey from 1997 to 2010.

Born in Sheffield, Truswell moved to Leeds at 18 to study History at the University of Leeds and initially worked as a journalist for the Yorkshire Evening Post for a decade. He then spent another ten years working in local government in social services at Wakefield Council.

He was elected at the age of 26 as a Leeds City Councillor for Headingley ward, until his election to Parliament after 15 years on the council.

Truswell retired as an MP at the 2010 general election. He had announced on 8 July 2009 that, "we all have to deal with life's many problems, but my recent traumatic car crash... has come on top of a period when I have found it increasingly difficult to undertake my heavy workload as an MP and to cope with a succession of family and personal issues, including illness, bereavement, and caring responsibilities.  I have reluctantly come to the conclusion that I do not, at this time, have the physical and mental stamina to fulfil both of the hugely demanding roles of MP and parliamentary candidate in the run-up to the next general election."

After leaving Parliament, he was re-elected to Leeds City Council in May 2012 for the Middleton Park ward.

References

External links 
Guardian Unlimited Politics - Ask Aristotle: Paul Truswell MP
TheyWorkForYou.com - Paul Truswell MP
 

1955 births
Living people
Politicians from Sheffield
Labour Party (UK) MPs for English constituencies
Alumni of the University of Leeds
UK MPs 1997–2001
UK MPs 2001–2005
UK MPs 2005–2010
Councillors in Leeds
People educated at Firth Park Academy